The 2018 Louisiana–Monroe Warhawks baseball team represents the University of Louisiana at Monroe in the 2018 NCAA Division I baseball season. The Warhawks play their home games at Warhawk Field. They are under the direction of first year head coach Michael Federico.

Schedule and results
Louisiana–Monroe announced its 2018 baseball schedule on November 15, 2017. The 2017 schedule consists of 27 home games in the regular season. The Warhawks will play 23 games against opponents who have won more than 30 games last season, including NCAA Tournament Participants, South Alabama and Arkansas.

The 2018 Sun Belt Conference Championship will be contested May 22–27 in Lafayette, Louisiana, and will be hosted by Louisiana–Lafayette.

 Rankings are based on the team's current  ranking in the Collegiate Baseball poll.

References

Louisiana-Monroe
Louisiana–Monroe Warhawks baseball seasons
Louis